This is a list of episodes from the CBS television comedy The Many Loves of Dobie Gillis. The first episode aired on September 29, 1959, and the final episode aired on June 5, 1963. There were 147 episodes in total.

Series overview

Episodes

Season 1 (1959–60)

Season 2 (1960–61)

Season 3 (1961–62)

Season 4 (1962–63)

References

External links

Lists of American sitcom episodes
Episodes